Joan Olive Bruce (born Joan Thompson) (29 February 192826 April 2014) was an English-Australian actress born in Surrey, England to George and Olive Thompson, and taking the stage surname name of Bruce after her maternal grandmother.

Biography 
Trained at the London Academy of Music and Dramatic Art, she appeared in repertory theatre in northern England from 1948, when after marrying first husband actor, director, stage manager and theatre entrepreneur Frank Baden-Powell in 1954, they immigrated the following year to Perth, Australia and toured Oceania with the Australian Elizabeth Trust company in plays Separate Tables and Sleeping Prince, with her husband taking on the role of stage manager and Bruce acting.  
 
After returning to Perth to give birth to her daughters, she appeared in plays The Anniversary, Entertaining Mr. Sloane and Who's Afraid of Virginia Woolf. Lauded for her performances, she was considered one of Perth's finest actors. In Adelaide she featured in the production of Patrick White's The Ham Funeral, and was awarded as actress of the year. Before taking the show to Sydney, she also was in the cast of Night on Bald Mountain, another play by Patrick White, before moving with her daughters to Sydney in 1968, and spending the next ten years working numerously including roles in The Entertainer, Travelling North, Heartbreak House, The Life and Times of Nicholas Appelby and Something Afoot.

She married her second husband Kenneth William in 1978, and subsequently appeared on television in roles in Chopper Squad and A Country Practice, before retiring in 1988. She was best known however for her long-running roles in the Australian soap opera Certain Women with Queenie Ashton and June Salter and for voicing the kangaroo and Dot's mother in the 1977 children's animation/live action film Dot and the Kangaroo.
She died in 2014, aged 86.

Filmography

Films

TV series

References

External links
 

1928 births
2014 deaths
British television actresses
British stage actresses
British soap opera actresses
British voice actresses
Alumni of the London Academy of Music and Dramatic Art
20th-century British actresses
Actresses from Surrey
20th-century Australian actresses
19th-century Australian women
20th-century English women
20th-century English people